Two singing boys with a lute and a music book is a painting by the Dutch Golden Age painter Frans Hals, painted c. 1625 and now in the Museum Schloss Wilhelmshöhe.

Painting 
This painting was documented by Hofstede de Groot in 1910, who wrote:
"TWO BOYS SINGING. B. 98; M. 224 - The boy on the right is seen in a three-quarter view facing left. He is in dark clothes with a white collar and a plumed cap. He holds in his left hand a lute resting on the table, while he beats time with his right hand. He looks down to the left at an open music-book on the table. Behind him to the left is the head of another boy, who looks at the music and sings with him.
Signed on the left at foot with the monogram; canvas, 26 inches by 20 1/2 inches."

Hals has "an accomplice" peering over his shoulder, and besides the other two paintings already mentioned, this theme of a main subject with a secondary witness was common to many of his paintings of the 1620s:

References

External links 
Information in the Web Gallery of Art

1625 paintings
Paintings of children
Musical instruments in art
Paintings by Frans Hals
Paintings in the collection of the Gemäldegalerie Alte Meister (Kassel)
Books in art